William Logie (20 September 1932 – 20 June 2016) was a Scottish footballer, who played for Cambuslang Rangers, Rangers, Aberdeen, Arbroath, Brechin City, and Alloa Athletic.

References

1932 births
2016 deaths
Scottish footballers
Canadian soccer players
Canadian people of Scottish descent
Soccer players from Montreal
Footballers from Stirling
Association football wing halves
Cambuslang Rangers F.C. players
Rangers F.C. players
Aberdeen F.C. players
Arbroath F.C. players
Brechin City F.C. players
Alloa Athletic F.C. players
Scottish Football League players
Scottish Junior Football Association players
Canadian expatriate soccer players
Canadian expatriate sportspeople in Scotland